is a Japanese tokusatsu series that aired on Tokyo MX from July 6 to September 21, 2007. This third entry in the Jikuu Keisatsu Wecker series featured veteran suit actor Sanshiro Wada as Chrono Investigator Orion and veteran tokusatsu actors Hiroshi Watari of Uchuu Keiji Sharivan as Chrono Investigator Exvarn and Ryu Manatsu of Ultraman Leo as Sumeragi Shishi, and Showtaro Morikubo as Onigumo.

Theme songs
Opening theme
"RING"
Lyrics: Masami Okui
Composition & Arrangement: Monta
Artist: Masami Okui
Ending theme
"MY PRECIOUS FRIENDS"
Lyrics: Natsuko Kondo
Composition: Yoshiko Kawamoto
Arrangement: Mikio Hirama
Artist: Signally's (Ai Hazuki, Takaou Ayatsuki, Ryo Shihono, Honoka Ayukawa)
Insert songs
 sung by Ai Hazuki for Saria Kasuga
"FAITH" sung by Takaou Ayatsuki for Rurika Natsuzawa
 sung by Ryo Shihono for Reina Fuyuki
 sung by Honoka Ayukawa for Emiri Akiba
"sign" sung by Showtaro Morikubo for Yusei Oda
"Who am I...?" sung by Showtaro Morikubo and Sanshiro Wada for Yusei Oda and Koshiro Orio

External links
Jikuu Keisatsu Wecker Signa at Layup 
Jikuu Keisatsu Wecker Signa  at Tokyo MX 
Jikuu Keisatsu Wecker Signa  at Vap.co.jp 

Tokusatsu television series